The Dyugon-class landing craft, or Project 21820, is a class of five air-cavity landing craft in service with the Russian Navy.

Ships

Controversies
According to Russian newspaper Izvestija, the central command of the Russian Navy sent a report to the Russian Defence minister after the sea trials of the first Dyugon-class landing craft in the Caspian Sea, complaining about serious design errors and poor workmanship in the craft, stating cracks developed in the hull while travelling at speed, potentially breaking the vessel apart. Izvestija also claimed the orders for the five vessels were split between multiple shipyards for socio-economic reasons... to keep them busy, instead of ordering them from a shipyard with experience in building air-cavity vessels.

See also
List of ships of the Soviet Navy
List of ships of Russia by project number

References

External links

Amphibious warfare vessel classes
Amphibious warfare vessels of the Russian Navy
Landing craft